John Fremantle may refer to:
 John Fremantle (British Army officer)
 John Fremantle, 5th Baron Cottesloe
 John Fremantle, 4th Baron Cottesloe

See also
 John Freemantle, English cricketer